Narsingrao Hullaji Suryawanshi (born January 20, 1952) is an Indian senior statesman who served as Member of Parliament in the Lok Sabha from Bidar four times. He belongs to the Indian National Congress party.

Early life
Narsingrao Suryawanshi was born in Dongaon village of Aurad Taluk in Bidar District. Suryawanshi and his siblings are children of farmers. He completed and earned a B.Sc. degree at Marathwada University, Aurangabad (Maharashtra) in 1974.

Career 
After graduating, he became a social worker. He traveled to villages, educating people about the 'No Dowry' system, and about the removal of untouchability, which was a major concern that year. He started Jawahar Lal Nehru Polytechnic College at Kushnoor and opened a hostel for poor students. 

He started Lal Bahadur Shastri Primary School, Mudhol. He served as president of Rastriya Rachnatmak Samitee and Arunodaya Education Society.

Politics
Suryawanshi applied for the Congress ticket in 1980 by post. He won the election in 1980  with a huge margin of 1.05 lakh votes (total votes 158,817) against Shankar Dev of JNP party who was the runner up (53,409 votes). He became its youngest member.

In 1984 Suryawanshi defeated Rajendra Verma of BJP with 59,615 votes (total votes 1,79,836). 

He won the 1989 elections with a margin of 38,947 votes (total votes being 1,77,828) against Prabhudev Kalmath IND.

Suryawanshi contested as a Congress candidate in the 2004 general elections, but was defeated by Ramachandra Veerappa by a margin of 23,539 votes. Suryawanshi received 289,217 votes. In that same year, Ramachandra Veerappa died and a by-election was held. Veerappa's son Basawraj Veerappa stood against Suryawanshi and lost by 13,470 votes, giving him a 4th term.

Suryawanshi appealed to Prime Minister Manmohan Singh to release additional funds for the completion of work on the Bidar-Gulbarga railway line. Suryawanshi and the District Congress Committee president Basavaraj Bulla noted that Bidar was not connected to Bangalore and other districts of the State because of lack of railway links. Trains from Bangalore have to pass through Andhra to reach Bidar.

Positions held
 1980: Elected as a Member of Parliament to the 7th Lok Sabha Congress (1st term)
 1984: Re-elected as a Member of Parliament to 8th Lok Sabha Congress (2nd term)
 1982-84: Member, Committee on the Welfare of Scheduled Castes and Scheduled Tribes
 1985-87: Member, Consultative Committee, Ministries of Industry, Commerce and Petroleum
 1988-89: Member, Business Advisory Committee
 1989: Re-elected as a Member of Parliament to 9th Lok Sabha Congress (3rd term)
 1990: Member of Parliament along with member, Committee on Official Language and Consultative Committee, Ministry of Railways
 2004: Re-elected as a Member of Parliament to 14th Lok Sabha Congress (4th term). Also a Member, Committee on Chemicals and Fertilizers and Consultative Committee, Ministry of Finance
 2007 5 Aug. Member, Committee on Chemicals & Fertilizers
 2007 7 Aug. Member, Committee on MPLADS

Personal life 
He married Sushila Suryawanshi. The couple has three sons (Sanjay, Vijay, Ajay), one daughter (Indira), a daughter-in-law (Priyanka), and a grandson (Ayush).

References

External links
 Members of Fourteenth Lok Sabha - Parliament of India website

1952 births
Living people
India MPs 1980–1984
India MPs 1984–1989
India MPs 1989–1991
India MPs 2004–2009
Indian National Congress politicians
Lok Sabha members from Karnataka
People from Bidar
People from Bidar district